Johann Richter can refer to:

 Johann Richter (footballer)
 Johann Heinrich Richter
 Johannes Praetorius
 Jean Paul, German Romantic writer, born Johann Paul Friedrich Richter